Four Gunmen of the Holy Trinity or Four Pistols for Trinity is a 1971 Italian western film directed by Giorgio Cristallini, scored by Roberto Pregadio and starring Peter Lee Lawrence, Evelyn Stewart, Daniele Vargas and Daniela Giordano.

Cast

References

External links
 

1971 Western (genre) films
1971 films
Italian Western (genre) films
Films directed by Giorgio Cristallini
Films scored by Roberto Pregadio
1970s Italian films